Parliamentary elections were held in Georgia on 31 October 1999, with second rounds in some constituencies on 7 and 14 November, and repeat elections in two constituencies  on 28 November. The result was a victory for the Union of Citizens of Georgia, which won 131 of the 235 seats. Voter turnout was 67.9%

Due to its breakaway status, the elections were not held in Abkhazia, resulting in the 12 MPs elected in 1992 retaining their seats.

Results

References

Georgia
1999 in Georgia (country)
Parliamentary elections in Georgia (country)
Election and referendum articles with incomplete results